"Do You Believe in Love" is the first top-ten hit for the American rock band Huey Lewis and the News, peaking at number seven in April 1982, off their second album Picture This. It was written by Robert John "Mutt" Lange.

History
When Lange wrote the song and submitted it to the band, it was entitled "We Both Believe In Love", but was retitled after Lewis made some lyrical revisions. The unrevised version was originally recorded by British band Supercharge, on which Lange sang lead vocals, on the 1979 album Body Rhythm.

The song became the band's breakthrough hit, peaking at number seven on the Billboard Hot 100 pop singles chart.

A music video for the song (filmed in February, 1982 in Los Angeles) features a scene with the band singing into a sleeping woman's ear, followed by the next morning, singing in the kitchen.  This video received heavy airplay in the early days of MTV, contributing to the breakthrough popularity of both the song and the band.

In the UK, the song was released as a double A side with "The Power of Love" in 1985. This release peaked at number nine on the UK Singles Chart, the band's only top ten hit in the territory.

Chart performance

Weekly charts

Year-end charts

References

External links
Video of performance by Supercharge performance at YouTube.com
Original music video at YouTube.com

Huey Lewis and the News songs
1982 songs
1982 singles
Songs written by Robert John "Mutt" Lange
Chrysalis Records singles